Theodore Skoutariotes (born ) was a Byzantine cleric and official during the reign of Michael VIII Palaiologos.

Skoutariotes was born about 1230. As a deacon, he served as epi ton deeseon (receiver of petitions) and was named as dikaiophylax in 1270. He served as Michael VIII's ambassador to the Pope in 1277, and was metropolitan bishop of Kyzikos from 1277 until he was deposed in 1282.

The German historian A. Heisenberg identified Skoutariotes with the anonymous author of a chronicle preserved in the Marcian Library in Venice (Marc. gr. 407), which begins with the Creation and reaches to 1261. The chronicle is particularly valuable for its additions to the narrative of George Akropolites, which are of great importance for the history of 13th-century Byzantium.

Sources
 

13th-century births
13th-century Byzantine bishops
Byzantine officials
13th-century Byzantine historians
Ambassadors of the Byzantine Empire to the Holy See
Bishops of Cyzicus
Date of death unknown
13th-century diplomats
13th-century Byzantine writers